Jordan Academy of Music is a private university located in Amman, Jordan. Established in 1989, its goal is to develop musical culture in the country.

References

University of Jordan
Universities and colleges in Jordan
Education in Amman